The 1st Tank Cavalry Regiment is a cavalry regiment of the Argentine Army, currently endowed with TAM tanks.

It has his seat in the Army Garrison of Villaguay (Entre Ríos province), which it shares with the 5th Mechanized Infantry Regiment.

References 

Regiments of Argentina